Kathryn Mary Binns (born 13 January 1958) is a retired female long-distance runner from England, who later was known as Kathryn Dickinson. She competed in the late 1970s and early 1980s in cross-country and distance races including the marathon and half marathon. Binns set her personal best (2:36:12) in the classic distance on 12 June 1982 in Windsor, Berkshire, defeating runner-up Carol Gould.

She finished ninth at the 1980 World Cross Country Championships, also winning a silver medal in the team competition.

Achievements

References
ARRS
gbrathletics

1958 births
Living people
British female long-distance runners
British female marathon runners
British female cross country runners